Leslie George Taylor (26 June 1894 – 17 January 1977) was a New Zealand cricketer who played first-class cricket for Auckland from 1911 to 1918.

Taylor made his first-class debut against Hawke's Bay in the last match of the 1910–11 season, making 59 and taking 4 for 35 in an innings victory for Auckland. His highest score was 92 against Canterbury in 1912–13. He toured Australia with the New Zealand team in 1913-14, playing in three of the four matches against state teams.

See also
 List of Auckland representative cricketers

References

External links
 Leslie Taylor at Cricinfo
 Leslie Taylor at CricketArchive

1894 births
1977 deaths
New Zealand cricketers
Pre-1930 New Zealand representative cricketers
Auckland cricketers